Michael Komarck is a fantasy artist. His work has been featured in many roleplaying games, board games, book covers, and collectible cards. Komarck produced the official art and calendars for George R.R. Martin's A Song of Ice and Fire.

Early life
Michael Komarck was born in Louisiana and moved to Michigan as a child.

Career
Komarck has worked as an illustrator on the Star Wars Galaxies Trading Card Game by Sony Online Entertainment. He has done illustrations for Magic: The Gathering and Hearthstone. He has also illustrated comic books.

Komarck has also worked as an illustrator for Dungeons & Dragons on third edition books.

He also provided the cover art for Voltaire's album, Raised by Bats.

Awards
Komarck was nominated for the Chesley Award for Best Cover Illustration – Paperback in 2009, for Dragonforge by James Maxey. Komarck was also nominated for the Hugo Award for Best Professional Artist in 2012.

References

External links 
 
 

Album-cover and concert-poster artists
Living people
Role-playing game artists
Year of birth missing (living people)